The Ministry for Line and Phoenix Islands Development (MLPID, also known by the portmanteau Linnix) is a government ministry of Kiribati, headquartered in London, Kiritimati. It focuses on the development of the Line Islands and Phoenix Islands. The ministry was founded after the 1978 Gilbertese Chief Minister election by Ieremia Tabai.

Ministers
Teewe Arobati (1978–1982)
Ieremia Tata (1982–)
Tekinaiti Kateie (1990–1991)
Abureti Takaio
Teiraoi Tetabea (1998–2002)
Tawita Temoku (2003–2016)
Mikarite Temari (2016–)

External link
MLPID

References

Government of Kiribati
Regional ministries